Kurt Caesar  (also known as Cesare Avai or Caesar Away, true name Kurt Kaiser; 30 March 1906 – 12 July 1974) was a German-Italian painter, journalist and comic book artist.

He was born at Montigny-lès-Metz, Alsace-Lorraine, to German father. He studied Engineering in Leipzig, but later he moved to the Academy of Fine Arts in Berlin; in the meantime he had a boxing career which led him to win a German title. In 1929 he became correspondent for a magazine in Zürich and collaborated for several German magazines; his journalist career led him to travel in Europe and Asia. After his marriage he moved to Italy, where he started to work at successful comics, such as Romano il Legionario, a popular nationalist character published in Il Vittorioso. He also drew "Aeroporto Z" and "Will Sparrow" for Paperino e altre avventure.

During World War II Caesar was in Morocco, Libya and Spain, and, in 1941, again in Africa as interpreter for Erwin Rommel. Captured by the English, he returned to Italy after the end of the conflict. Here he continued to work at Il Vittorioso until, in 1952, he was called as cover artist for the science-fiction magazine I Romanzi di Urania, for which he realized some 170 works until 1958, when he was replaced by Carlo Jacono. Caesar then moved to other popular magazine-book series for the same publisher, Arnoldo Mondadori Editore, I Gialli and Segretissimo. Other series he worked to include the unsuccessful Italian science fiction magazines Oltre il Cielo and Cronache del Futuro, and the German Perry Rhodan.
 
He died by infarction in 1974 in his house at Bracciano.

References

External links
March and fight of the German Africa Corps in 1941: Drawings by Kurt Caesar, more than 90 drawings, at AllWorldWars.Com

1906 births
1974 deaths
People from Montigny-lès-Metz
People from Alsace-Lorraine
20th-century German painters
20th-century Italian male artists
German male painters
20th-century Italian painters
Italian male painters
German comics artists
Italian comics artists
German male journalists
German journalists
German male writers